Inayat Bunglawala was media secretary of the Muslim Council of Britain until 2010.

He joined The Young Muslims UK in 1987. He is also a co-presenter of the weekly 'Politics and Media Show' on the Islam Channel (SKY 813). In October 2009 he registered the domain name Muslims4UK.org.uk, thus launching a group which is described as "set up to celebrate the UK's democratic traditions and promote active Muslim engagement in our society".

Work 
Some of Bunglawala's views as media secretary for the Muslim Council of Britain were quoted in the press. He has discussed matters of religion as well as politics.

Tackling extremism together
Despite accusations of anti-Semitism, Bunglawala was selected as one of seven "conveners" of a Home Office task force with responsibilities for tackling extremism among young Muslims. He rejects these accusations as a "traditional Zionist tactic" aimed to "silence critics of Israel", as he is an outspoken defender of what he considers to be Israeli oppression of Palestinians. Home Secretary Charles Clarke said in response: "I am grateful to the working groups for drawing up such constructive ideas. We look forward to continuing the dialogue with Muslim communities and supporting the work that they are undertaking.”

Political views 
Bunglawala has commented that many Muslims believed the UK's involvement in wars against Afghanistan and Iraq were a "key contributory factor in the radicalisation" of some young Muslims, but added: "extremists often paint a very unfair picture of the West. We all benefit from freedoms and opportunities here that are not exactly plentiful in many Muslim countries."

He has been a critic of US foreign policy, saying: "The US government needs to demonstrate that it is prepared to be more even-handed in its relations with Muslims and Muslim countries." Regarding the torture of Iraqis at Abu Ghraib by US soldiers, he said: "I think this type of activity by U.S. forces will only further anger the Muslim population of Iraq."

Controversies 
He opposed the banning of Hizb ut-Tahrir under the UK anti-terror laws. Bunglawala considers Ahmed Yassin to be an important Islamic scholar and he opposes the Muslim Association of Britain's removal from the Muslim Council.

In January 1993, Bunglawala wrote a letter to Private Eye, a satirical magazine, in which he called Omar Abdel-Rahman "courageous". After Rahman's arrest on charges of masterminding the bombing of the World Trade Center in New York in July that year, Bunglawala guessed that it was only because of his "calling on Muslims to fulfil their duty to Allah and to fight against oppression and oppressors everywhere". Five months before the September 11, 2001 attacks, Bunglawala also circulated writings of Osama bin Laden, whom he called a "freedom fighter", to hundreds of Muslims in Britain.

References

British writers of Indian descent
Living people
Year of birth missing (living people)
British Muslim activists
British people of Gujarati descent
Dawoodi Bohras